Starcon is the oldest and the largest festival of science fiction, fantasy, movie and science in the CIS and Baltic countries. Starcon takes place every summer in St. Petersburg Russia.

Format 
The festival consists of three main zones:
 Main stage, where people can see various show programs and cosplay competitions.
 Exhibition area. Includes thematic stands, that represent decorations from books, comics, movies etc. Participants of stands also wear costumes and organise different competitions, quests and activities.
 Science zone includes an exhibition and a conference, where people can attend lectures of scientists and experts from various fields.

History

Before 2013 
The first Starcon was held in Moscow in 1999. At first, the festival was set to unite all the Star Wars` fans. In this form the festival existed from 1999 to 2010, gathering about 100-300 people.

In 2011, Starcon expanded the scope up to science fiction and was attended by over 350 people.

In 2012, the festival was passed off to Igor Pylaev and the team of volunteer organizers. Since then there have been a few changes.
 The festival moved to Saint Petersburg.
 The scope of the event was expanded. Starcon became a festival dedicated to science fiction in pop culture: thematic TV series, films and animation, literature, games, and comics.
 The scientific section was added. There people can attend lectures about modern robotic science and technologies, genetics, bioinformatics and spacecraft.

2013 
In 2013, Starcon changed location and took place at the Garden City ExpoCentre, becoming the first event in such format in Russia. The first release of comics Adventure Time in Russian language and the premier of the first Russian Zombie movie “Meteletsa: Winter of the Dead” were presented at Starcon.

In 2013, over 5,000 people attended Starcon making for exponential growth.

2014 
In 2014, Starcon again changed location - this time the festival took place in Lenexpo Exhibition Complex.

For the first time festival had added a movie section:
 special screenings of "The Avengers", "Thor: The Dark World", "Iron man 3", "Hunger games", "Captain America: The Winter Soldier" in RealD;
 the exclusive show from The Walt Disney Company: 9 minutes of the film "Guardians of the Galaxy" and a special video message from the film's Director James Gunn;
 the premiere of the film "Dawn of the Planet of the Apes" from the Studio "Twentieth Century Fox"

Special guests:
Andrei Borisenko - cosmonaut of the Russian Federation, Hero of the Russian Federation
Dmitry Gromov and Oleg Ladydgenskiy - Ukraine fantasy writers, their pen name - Henry Lion Oldy
Maria Semenova - a writer, the author of legendary "Wolfhound"
Stas Davydov - the hoster of the Internet-show "This is Horosho"

In 2014 over 15 000 people have visited Starcon

2015 
In 2015, Starcon again took place in Lenexpo Exhibition Complex, but for the first time It lasted three days and took all 3 pavilions, including street zone as well. The total festival area included 20 000 sq.m., and the number of participants was over 40 000 people.

The movie section contained 
 special screenings of "Interstellar" , "The Guardians of the Galaxy", "Mad Max : Fury Road", "Ant-Man", "Kingsman: The Secret Service" , "The Avengers: Age of Ultron" and "Terminator: Genesis" 
 the premiere of film "Fantastic Four" from the "Twentieth Century Fox" Studio

Special guests 
 Elena Serova -  cosmonaut, Hero of the Russian Federation
 Mark Serov - cosmonaut
 writers - Dmitry Puchkov, Dmitry Rus, Maria Semyonova
 bloggers - Stepan Pinzhin Tatorio, Mark Voronin Vendy, Alexander Sokolov Sokol[off], Vic Kisimyaka.

Festivals

Starcon 2016 
In 2016, Starcon will was held on July 8, 9 and 10 in “EXPOFORUM” Convention and Exhibition Centre and in pavilions F, G and H, and also congress-center, utilizing .

References 

Festivals in Russia
Science fiction conventions in Europe